Mad Show Boys is a Latvian band.

Mad Show Boys consists of Garijs Poļskis (Гарри Польский) as leader of the band, lead vocal and songs author, Leonid Sprat as lead vocal (since 2019), Angela Serkevich as vocal (since 2013), Santa Savicka-Drozdova as vocal (since 2019), Martiņš Kits as vocal (songs on Latvia language), Andris Lapiņš as back vocal, Aldis Zaļūksnis, Jānis Vaišļa,  Aleksandrs Veselovs (lead vocal since 2013), Misters X. Jānis Vaišļa has previously participated in Eurovision with band Pirates of the Sea (Eurovision 2008).

Discography 
 Включите улыбальнички! (2011)
 Sorry for Bad English! (2013)
 Эпидемия добра (2015)
 Romantika (2016)
 ''Чудо из ниоткуда (2020)

References

External links
 
 , YouTube 
 https://vk.com/madshowboys
 https://www.tiktok.com/@madshowboys?lang=ru-RU
 http://www.facebook.com/madshowboys
Latvian pop music groups